The Liege is a lightweight two-seater car. An original design by Peter Davis, inspired by the classic sporting car era of the 1950s.

Fifty of these cars were supplied in component form between 1997 and 2007. Designed and developed from 1985 to 1996 in Bidford-on-Avon, Warwickshire, England. Manufactured at Craycombe in Fladbury, Worcestershire. Their agility off-road led to them being used in Classic Reliability Trials as organised by the Motor Cycling Club.

The Liege has a glass fibre body with an integral floor bonded in. The chassis is a simple but strong ‘A’ frame, with independent double wishbone front suspension. The live rear axle is from the Suzuki Carry which has a 5.1-1 ratio to suit the  Liege cast aluminium wheels. Coilspring shock absorbers are used all round. The 850 cc four-cylinder aluminium engine is from a Reliant Robin. The braking, being period, has  Reliant-spec drums front and rear. The spare wheel mounted on the back allowed a small space in the rear for soft luggage and all-weather equipment.

See also

 Dellow

References

External links

The Liege car website has information and pictures of Liege cars: 

Kit car manufacturers
Defunct motor vehicle manufacturers of England
Cars introduced in 1997